Mihăeşti may refer to:

 Mihăești, Argeș, a commune in Argeș County, Romania
 Mihăești, Olt, a commune in Olt County, Romania
 Mihăești, Vâlcea, a commune in Vâlcea County, Romania

See also 
 Mihai (name)
 Mihăiești (disambiguation)
 Mihăileni (disambiguation)
 Mihăilești